Danny Chien (born 20 November), better known by his stage name Wax Motif, is an Australian DJ and producer based in Los Angeles, United States.

Career
Wax Motif's work has drawn critical acclaim and support from Diplo, Major Lazer, A-Trak, GTA, Oliver Heldens, Jauz, Tommy Trash.

Wax Motif is known for his contribution to the G-House movement. Wax Motif worked with Destructo for his album on Interscope. They worked with Ty Dolla Sign, YG, Young Thug, Problem, Warren G. His DJ sets incorporate this style heavily into his mixing.

In an interview with Thump, Wax Motif claims his influences range from R&B, to disco and UK bass. His debut EP for Mad Decent, True Joy is a reflection of this multi-genre approach, with a G-house focus.

Wax Motif has performed at EDC Las Vegas, New York, and Mexico, Electric Zoo, HARD Summer, Day of the Dead, Holy Ship, Stereosonic, and Splendor in the Grass.

He has released tracks and remixes through A-Trak's Fool's Gold, Skrillex's Owsla, Steve Aoki's Dim Mak Records. A compilation on legendary label Strictly Rhythm as well as a host of remixes for YG, Young Thug, Kid Ink, Chromeo, Deadmau5, Warren G's "Regulate" and more.

Discography

Extended plays

Singles

As lead artist

As collaborator

As featured artist

Remixes

2014 
 Tinashe - 2 On (feat. Schoolboy Q) (Wax Motif Remix)
 YG - "My Nigga" (feat. Jeezy & Rich Homie Quan) (Destructo & Wax Motif Remix)
 Warren G - Regulate (Destructo & Wax Motif Remix)

2015 
 Kid Ink - Be Real (feat. Dej Loaf) (Wax Motif & Gladiator Remix)
 Etnik - Unclassified (Wax Motif Remix)

2017 
 Major Lazer - Run Up (feat. PartyNextDoor & Nicki Minaj) (Wax Motif Remix)
 AC Slater & Chris Lorenzo - Fly Kicks (Wax Motif Remix)

References

Australian DJs
Living people
Australian record producers
Year of birth missing (living people)
Mad Decent artists